The World Woman Pro-Wrestling Diana World Championship (often known as the WWWD Certified World Singles Championship) is a women's professional wrestling championship promoted by the Japanese professional wrestling promotions World Woman Pro-Wrestling Diana. During its existence, the title has been promoted by various other promotions such as Pro Wrestling Wave on World Wonder Ring Stardom while held by certain wrestlers who were part of federations from out of World Woman Pro-Wrestling Diana.

There have been a total of sixteen reigns and one vacancy shared between nine different champions. The current title holder is Ayako Sato who is in her third reign.

Reigns

Combined reigns 

{| class="wikitable sortable" style="text-align: center"
!Rank
!Wrestler
!No. ofreigns
!Combineddefenses
!Combineddays
|-
!1
| || 4 || 3 || 1,395
|-
!2
|style="background-color:#FFE6BD"|Ayako Sato † || 3 || 4 || +
|-
!3
| || 2 || 1 || 388
|-
!4
| || 2 || 3 || 372
|-
!5
| || 1 || 1 || 261
|-
!6
| || 1 || 1 || 143
|-
!7
| || 1 || 0 || 98
|-
!8
| || 1 || 1 || 96
|-
!9
| || 1 || 0 || 42

External links
Woman Pro-Wrestling Diana World Championship history

References 

World professional wrestling championships
Women's professional wrestling championships